An asset lock is a legal clause that prevents the assets of a company from being used for private gain rather than the stated purposes of the organisation. Asset locks may be incorporated into the formal structure of a "bencom" (a type of industrial and provident society), community interest company, or charitable organisation.

Corporate law